The California College Republicans (CCR) is a California state organization for college and university students who support the Republican Party of the United States. Founded on August 29, 1963, the organization is the official chartered youth wing and a recruiting tool for the California Republican Party. It has produced many prominent republican and conservative activists, with notable alumni such as Kevin McCarthy, Ben Shapiro, and Kevin Kiley.

CCR is a political action committee (PAC) that is not affiliated with and operates independently from the College Republican National Committee (CRNC).

History

Founding and Early History 
CCR began with 1,800 members on August 29, 1963 — founded by Randolph Siefkin, Harold Phillips, William Nielsen, William Dillon, and Pete Wilson (who went on to serve as a US Senator from 1983 to 1991 and Governor of California from 1991 to 1999).

The 1963 mission statement of CCR read: The specific and primary purposes for which this corporation is formed are to support the Republican party, to provide pleasure and recreation for the members, to encourage constructive thinking among young people and the development of their interest in good government, and to unite young people in the spirit of good fellowship to achieve these objectives.CCR was formed as a break-off group of the California Young Republican College Federation, also known as the California College Federation of Young Republicans, following election disputes in 1962 and 1963. In 1962, the moderates and conservatives violently clashed, with Walter Driver of the conservatives stating six sergeant-at-arms "banged my head into a chair and my body into a wall."

Harold Phillips of the moderates ultimately prevailed in the election as chair.

In 1963, competing conventions of a conservative wing and a moderate wing each elected new chairmen. Trent Devenney and Randy Siefkin each claimed legitimacy, with the California Young Republicans organization — at the time the parent organization of the college federation — set to recognize Devenney. At the same time, nationally, College Republican groups began to break off from the Young Republican groups, where one would service students and the other would service young adults. Siefkin helped lead this split in California, taking his moderate wing of students with him to form CCR. CCR would go on to charter with the College Republican National Committee (CRNC) (which it later separated from in 2019) after it broke off from the Young Republican National Federation. The California Young Republican College Federation continued to exist as part of the California Young Republicans and the Young Republican National Federation until 1969, when they merged with CCR in a unity election. The unification was supported and partially brokered by then-Governor Ronald Reagan.

Reagan enjoyed and worked closely with the youth — among them CCR members — during his campaigns and tenure. In 1988, he described CCR as "A group I take a kind of personal interest in..."

CCR also earned the admiration and attention of another President, Gerald Ford. In 1967, then-House Minority Leader Ford attended the annual CCR convention in Santa Barbara as the keynote speaker. He concluded with the following: We must build the Republican Party ... We can do that if college Republicans here and throughout the Nation will rise to the responsibility that is theirs--the challenge to go out into the wilderness of young Democrats and come back with some scalps. The future of the Republican Party, ladies and gentlemen, is in your hands.CCR conventions have featured a number of notable speakers over the years, including Gov. Pete Wilson, Gov. George Deukmejian, Lt. Gov. Edwin Reinecke, Lt. Gov. Mike Curb, Rep. Barry Goldwater Jr., Milo Yiannopoulos, Amb. Richard Grenell, Rep. Paul Gosar, and many others.

1963 was not the only time CCR faced competing conventions and claims of legitimacy. In 1987, Fred Whitaker (who went on to serve as Chairman of the Republican Party of Orange County) and Jim Michalski ran for chairman. Whitaker, unable to mount enough delegates to win the election, led a walkout at the 1987 election, hoping to break quorum. However, not enough delegates left with Whitaker, and the election proceeded with a vote for Michalski. Whitaker, meanwhile, convened his own convention with the delegates that followed him, where they elected him as chairman. This triggered a crisis over the rightful Chairman of CCR.

Whitaker was backed by CRNC Chairman Stockton Reeves, and Michalski was backed by the California Republican Party. The state party stepped in with, according to the San Francisco Examiner, "a private meeting trying to resolve a dispute between two college Republican groups." This led to party leadership, including CAGOP Chairman Bob Naylor, missing a vote of the party convention calling for the prosecution of the San Francisco AIDS foundation. The state party eventually caved to the CRNC and agreed to recognize both groups as equal and legitimate. They finally merged again in 1988, following a unity convention. In an interview with the Orange County Register, Whitaker said: "'I was running for chairman of the state College Republicans and we split into two organizations,' ... A 'unity convention' followed and both groups reunited a year later..." Whitaker was defeated by Michalski in the unity convention rematch election.

Modern History 
Prior to the election of businessman Donald Trump in 2016, the California College Republicans had not had a contested election in nearly a decade. Trump's election sparked a resurgence of youth activism in California, which led to Ariana Rowlands' involvement in the College Republicans. In 2017, Rowlands built a socially conservative and pro-Trump coalition to contest the CCR heir apparent, Vice-chair Leesa Danzek, for the position of chairman. Danzek and her faction were considered the moderate-wing of CCR.

The 2017 convention was derailed before voting began, with the OC Register summarizing the events:Hours-long debates on parliamentary procedures and questions about who could and couldn’t vote ended with student organizers booting more than 150 delegates from a Double Tree Hotel ballroom in San Jose, where the election was being held, into a hallway. The meeting dissolved into heated debates over procedures and by the time some delegates were allowed to return, it was too late. Hotel staff said it was time to go.The CCR Convention was reconvened in October 2017 at the California Republican Party Fall Convention. By that point, Leesa Danzek had assumed the chairmanship following Ivy Allen's resignation in August. At the meeting, the LA Times reported that "[M]embers accused Danzek of using her influence over the state organization to withhold information about the election and improperly disqualify some students from voting"

Despite the tensions, Rowlands emerged the victor by a vote of 88–64.

Rowlands remained popular enough to win reelection in 2018, where she staged the largest attended CCR convention in modern history. She was listed as one of Washington Examiner's "30 Under 30," and brought renewed media attention to CCR from "FOX News, ABC 7 and The Daily Ledger ... Breitbart News ... TIME..."

However, she also faced scandal in her second term. Rowlands and her successor, Kimo Gandall, were accused of allegedly removing CCR members and chapters they disliked via the Judicial Board case Gandall et al. v Morcott et al, which found two members guilty of violating the CCR constitution and stripped their voting rights. According to the Judicial case in question, no further action was taken, and the members and chapters in question remained part of CCR. The case order read:[O]rder (1) does not imply formal expulsion from the California College Republicans ... order (3) does not imply the permanent forced dechartering of the defendants’ respective chapters ... [T]o regain the ability to send delegates to the annual convention ... the members may remove the defendants from the presidency of their respective chapters, or (2) the members may amend their governing documents to legally appropriate the power to petition CCR away from the president and to some other member of their chapter as they see fit.However, dissatisfaction with Rowlands led to another contested election in 2019. Kimo Gandall, backed by Rowlands, and  Matt Ronnau each built slates of candidates and announced their intention to run for the CCR Executive Board. Prior to the 2019 election, Ronnau and his slate dropped out of the race and led a push for 10 clubs to decharter, or disassociate, from CCR instead of attending and running in the election. In the press release announcing the mass decharter, the clubs charged that CCR was "Failing to address ... repeated concerns," yet the clubs in question did not appear at the election or introduce legislation to amend CCR's constitution. Gandall was elected chairman.

Most of the 10 clubs that left went on to form a new organization, the California Federation of College Republicans (CFCR). CFCR is regarded as "an establishment GOP group that broke away from the more pro-Trump California College Republicans in 2019." CCR, meanwhile, "describe themselves as the 'Trump wing of the GOP'" — and continuing Rowlands' socially conservative legacy.

CCR maintains a supermajority of College Republican clubs in California as of 2021.

The Administrations of Gandall's successor, Nick Ortiz, and Ortiz's successor, Will Donahue, have been credited with getting the organization verified on Twitter, Facebook, and Instagram — the first state College Republican organization in the country to do so — and growing social media following to that of the largest out of any other state College Republican organization on Facebook and Instagram (as of 2021).

Independence from CRNC 
The California College Republicans are an independent organization, unaffiliated with the College Republican National Committee (CRNC), as of 2019. According to a press release from CCR, the California Federation of College Republicans (CFCR), "an establishment" splinter group from the "pro-Trump" CCR, petitioned the CRNC to revoke CCR's charter. The statement reads:On Saturday, July 13th, despite Gandall agreeing to many of the terms for mediation, the CRNC ruled that CCR was to be “dechartered." ... Gandall strongly objected ... but his appeals were rejected without reason. “Despite my objections in Committee under my right to a point of order, the arbitrator illegally awarded CFCR the charter. But this isn’t allowed in the Bylaws,” said Kimo Gandall, Chairman of the California College Republicans. “CRNC has a secret constitution that is not public,” continued Gandall, “and once I leaked it, I found that there were deep discrepancies. §2(5)(b)CCR is not the only organization that is independent from the CRNC. In 2021, the CRNC controversially stripped the voting rights of several state federations that backed the election of Judah Waxelbaum over Courtney Britt for CRNC Chairman. Among those disqualified were Texas, New York, Mississippi, North Dakota, and Puerto Rico, who all voted to secede following Britt's election. The action's of the CRNC earned condemnation and words of support for the allegedly disenfranchised states from the New York, Connecticut, Arizona, and Arkansas Republican parties, as well as from Elise Stefanik, George P. Bush, John Boozman, and more.

Activities 
CCR is primarily known for managing statewide get-out-the-vote efforts among its chapters, as well as its campus activism. At other times, CCR endorses candidates for office, pushes issue advocacy and lobbying efforts, hosts conservative guest speakers, and organizes social events and other recruitment activities.

Chapters traditionally table on campus for recruitment. Members use door-to-door canvassing, phonebanking, and word of mouth to identify and register Republican voters.

CCR, in particular, has been notable for its controversial campus activism events, including Affirmative action bake sales, pro-Trump chalking, and hosting provocative speakers like Rep. Paul Gosar.

Governing Structure

State Organization 
The leadership team of CCR makes up the state executive board, which includes a state chairperson and other officers as well as any subcommittees. The Board serves as the primary link between local university chapters and the California Republican Party. The state chairman, Committeeman, and Communications Director serve as representatives for CCR when dealing with the Republican Party and local media. The Chairman and Treasurer serve as representatives with state filings and governmental entities.

Chapters that make up the state organization are divided into regions across California, of which there are eight. Each region is managed by a Regional Chair that is part of the executive board. The regions as of 2021 are:

 Northern. Amador, Alpine, Lake, Colusa, Sutter, Yuba, Nevada, Sierra, Glenn, Butte, Plumas, Tehama, Lassen, Shasta, Modoc, Mendocino, Del Norte, Siskiyou, Humboldt, and Trinity Counties.
 Capitol. Yolo, Sacramento, Placer, El Dorado, San Joaquín, and Solano counties.
 Bay Area. Sonoma, Napa, San Francisco, Marin, Contra Costa, Alameda, San Mateo, Santa Cruz, and Santa Clara counties.
 Central Coast. San Benito, Monterey, Santa Barbara, San Luis Obispo, Ventura counties. Malibu city.
 Central Valley. Kern, Kings, Tulare, Inyo, Fresno, Madera, Merced, Stanislaus, Tuolumne, Mono, Mariposa, and Calaveras Counties
 Southern. San Bernardino, Orange, and Riverside counties.
 Los Angeles. Los Angeles County.
 San Diego. San Diego and Imperial counties.

CCR assists local chapters in each region with securing proper credentials, recruitment efforts, and canvassing and other get-out-the-vote (GOTV) efforts. They also provide chapters with tabling materials, legal resources, and other help as needed. CCR also organizes activities and deployments for the California Republican Party and statewide campaigns. The group is registered as a non-profit political action committee (PAC).

Campus Chapters 
The college and university-based chapters of CCR operate in a dual capacity as student clubs associated with their campus, as well as members of the state federation. Like CCR, the campus chapters are also affiliated with the local Republican Party. The chapter chairperson and leadership team are responsible for maintaining the campus club's registration, charter with CCR, and constitution. They also represent the club when dealing with CCR, the university administration, other student groups, and in the surrounding community. A chapter leadership team might include many members; commonly found are a president and vice president (chairman and vice chairman), a treasurer, a secretary, and a social media director.

Clubs associate with, or charter, with CCR by sending the state leadership their constitution, executive board members, a membership list, and proof of school recognition. Charters are permanent and may only be dissolved by a petition to and vote of the CCR Board of Directors, an annual meeting of all CCR chapter presidents.

Elections and Conventions

Annual Convention and Elections 
State leadership is elected at a yearly convention — one of two major meetings of the California College Republicans each year (the other is a Board of Directors meeting and training session). The convention, simply known as "Convention," is the annual meeting for delegates from all CCR chapters to run for office, pass legislation, amend the Constitution (bylaws), hear from party leadership, and network. The convention has generally taken place between February and May each year, in congruence with the Spring Convention of the California Republican Party. Due to the COVID-19 pandemic, the 2020 convention of the California College Republicans was delayed until July 11, 2021. This reorganized the timing of the convention to now take place during the summer.

Board of Directors Meeting 
State leadership convenes one or more Board of Directors (referred to as Senate from 2018 to 2021) meetings each year. The meetings are of chapter presidents and any other members that wish to attend. Topics covered by the meeting include passing budgets, approving legislation, trying impeachments of officers, and hearing club charter disputes. The meetings also involve training sessions on issues like fundraising, networking, social media development, and more. The meeting is typically held at the same time as the California Republican Party Fall convention, usually in September or October.

State Leadership 
As of the 2022 State Convention in Las Vegas at the Excalibur Hotel, the CCR Executive Board consists of:

Chairmen of the California College Republicans 
The Chairman of CCR is tasked with serving as a primary representative of CCR, setting the agenda, appointing vacancies of the executive board, fundraising, maintaining legal filings, serving as a California Republican Party delegate, and ensuring the annual convention and Board of Directors meeting occur — as well as any other duties that may arise.

*Grace Jordan was CCR's first female and first black chairwoman.

**Jim Michalski and Fred Whitaker were both Chairmen of competing wings of CCR between 1987 and 1988. Michalski won the 1988 rematch unity election.

***Cheyenne Steel is the daughter of RNC Committeeman Shawn Steel and Congresswoman Michelle Steel.

****Nick Ortiz was the first publicly gay chairman of CCR

Committeemen of the California College Republicans 
The Committeeman of the California College Republicans is a role that has changed over time. From 1967 to 1969, the role served as a representative to the College Republican National Committee (CRNC). The role was then merged with the position of chairman. In 2021, the role of Committeeman was reestablished to serve as a representative of CCR with newly CRNC-independent state federations, the College Republicans United, and the California Republican Party.

The current Committeeman is Dylan Martin of San Diego, elected on July 10, 2021. He is the first known to hold the post since 1969.

*Dylan Martin is the first publicly gay Committeeman of CCR.

Involvement in the Split of the College Republican National Committee (CRNC) 
The position of Committeeman was reformed to help manage relationships with, partly, other state federations after their declarations of independence from the College Republican National Committee (CRNC) in 2021.

Committeeman Martin helped successfully broker a partnership with the College Republicans United and CCR, which gave the organization its first national College Republican allies following CCR's independence from the CRNC in 2019.

Notable alumni 

 Shawn Steel, Republican National Committeeman from California and former Chairman of the California Republican Party
 Pete Wilson, 36th Governor of California
 Kevin Kiley, California State Assemblyman
Ben Shapiro, political commentator
Kevin McCarthy, Congressman and House Republican Leader (CA-23)
Fred Whitaker, Chairman of the Republican Party of Orange County
Panagiotis Frousiakis, Candidate for Huntington Beach City Council 2022
Dana Rohrabacher, former Congressman (CA-48)
Ed Royce, former Congressman (CA-39)
Matthew Harper, former California State Assemblyman
John Rice-Cameron, son of Democrat National Security Advisor Susan Rice

See also 

 California Republican Party
Republican National Committee
 Young Republicans
 Teenage Republicans
 The New York Young Republican Club

References

External links 

 California College Republicans – official website
 California College Republicans' Secretary of State of California Filing Forms

 
Republican Party (United States) organizations
Student organizations established in 1892
527 organizations
Conservative organizations in the United States
Student wings of political parties in the United States
International Young Democrat Union
Youth wings of political parties in the United States